The 1953 Kangaroo Tour of New Zealand was a mid-season tour of New Zealand by the Australia national rugby league team. The Australians played nine matches on tour, including three tests against the New Zealand national rugby league team. The tour began on 24 June and finished on 18 July.

Leadership 
Clive Churchill was both the captain and the coach of the touring side. He appeared in eight of the nine matches.
In the one game in which Churchill was absent, against Northland, Ken McCaffery captained the Australian team.
The team was managed by Dudley Locke of Wollongong and George McLeod of Maryborough.

Touring squad 
The Rugby League News published the touring team including the players' ages and weights. Match details - listing surnames of both teams and the point scorers - were included in E.E. Christensen's Official Rugby League Yearbook, as was a summary of the players' point-scoring. 
Crocker, Davies, Drew, Hornery, Banks, McCaffery, McGovern and Watson were selected from Queensland clubs. Carlson, Gill and Paul were selected from clubs in New South Wales Country areas. The balance of the squad had played for Sydney based clubs during the 1953 season.

Tour 
The Australians played nine matches on the tour, winning seven matches and losing two, both being tests against the Kiwis.

First test

Second test

Third test

References 

Australia national rugby league team tours
Rugby league tours of New Zealand
Kangaroo tour of New Zealand
Kangaroo tour of New Zealand